Sarah DeRemer Knauss (September 24, 1880 – December 30, 1999) was an American supercentenarian. She is the oldest person ever from the United States and, on April 16, 1998, became the world's oldest living person. She remains as the third-oldest well-documented person ever, living to the age of 119 years and 97 days. Her birthdate has been independently verified through numerous census and other records.

Early life
Sarah DeRemer Clark was born on September 24, 1880, to Walter Clark and his wife Amelia, the daughter of German immigrants, in Hollywood, Luzerne County, Pennsylvania, a small coal-mining community. Her family later moved to South Bethlehem, Pennsylvania. She was the third of her parents' seven children, but three of her brothers died in infancy and childhood.

Personal life
She married Abraham Lincoln Knauss (1878–1965) in 1901; Abraham was originally a tanner. He later became a prominent Lehigh County, Pennsylvania, Republican leader and the recorder of deeds for this county, serving from 1937 until retiring in 1951. Abraham died in 1965, at the age of 86. Their only child, Kathryn, was born in 1903 and died in 2005 at the age of 101. Through most of her life, Knauss acted as a housewife. She enjoyed knitting, crocheting, and sewing.

Before Knauss' death, there were six living generations in her family. Life magazine, in February 1999, took a photo of Knauss along with a member from each of these generations, up to her newborn great-great-great grandchild.

Health and lifestyle
It was not until Knauss reached 111 years old that she took up residency at a nursing home in Allentown, Pennsylvania due to her frailness and failing eyesight. In 1995, Knauss remarked that she enjoyed her life because she still had her health and could "do things." At 117 years old, Knauss underwent a blood transfusion due to having low haemoglobin, and she continued to take heart medication for the rest of her life. Those around her believed her to be of sound mind up until her death, and within the last year of her life, she still had conversations with her daughter Kathryn. Eventually, she did struggle to recognize her daughter; however, this may have been due to her failing hearing and eyesight rather than a failing mind.

When asked how she had survived to her great age, Knauss responded that one should “keep yourself busy, work hard, and not worry about how old you are.” She was a non-smoker and was never considered obese at any point in her life. She did have a fondness for sweets, however, and her great-granddaughter claimed that Knauss "hated vegetables." A member of the staff at Knauss' nursing home claimed that she was the friendliest of all residents at the home, and her relatives failed to remember a point in her life that she scolded anyone or even appeared stressed.

Death
Knauss died of natural causes on December 30, 1999 in Allentown, Pennsylvania. An autopsy was performed on her body, but the results were never made public; however, she was not known to have been suffering from any illness at the time of her death. After her death, Eva Morris of the United Kingdom (1885–2000) became the world's oldest living person.

She remained the second oldest known validated person until Kane Tanaka surpassed her age on 10 April 2022.

Longevity records and verification
At age 116, Knauss was recognized as being the new United States national longevity record holder, then thought to have been Carrie C. White (reportedly 1874–1991). On April 16, 1998, she became the world's oldest person after 117-year-old French Canadian Marie-Louise Meilleur died. Knauss remains the oldest documented person from the United States, and is the third-oldest fully documented person ever, after French supercentenarian Jeanne Calment and Japanese supercentenarian Kane Tanaka.  She was recognized as the world's oldest living person by Guinness World Records from April 16, 1998 until her death the next year at the age of 119 years and 97 days.

Knauss' records have been heavily reviewed to ensure the claims surrounding her lifespan are legitimate. Many records have been found that verify her claim, including the record of the 1890 census, taken when Knauss was still in childhood.

See also
 List of the verified oldest people

References

External links
 Photo portrait—Sarah Knauss aged 117 in 1997 CBC News
 
 Allentown Morning Call collection of articles about her 1993–2000

1880 births
1999 deaths
American supercentenarians
people from Allentown, Pennsylvania
people from Luzerne County, Pennsylvania
women supercentenarians